Maricarmen Marín Salinas is a Peruvian actress, cumbia singer, dancer, and TV host. She started as a dancer in the musical show "La movida de los Sabados" and she became famous as the lead singer of the female technocumbia musical group "Agua Bella".  Maricarmen participated in El Gran Show in 2010. In 2011 she currently stars as Natasha in the América Televisión series "Yo no me llamo Natacha" (English: "My name is not Natacha") for which she also performed the theme song.  She is also currently a solo singer. In 2018, she released her new hit song ¿Por Qué Te Fuiste? (English: "Why did you leave?") which had airplay success throughout Latin America and Europe. 

In December 2020 she released a children's book about her childhood Christmas adventures titled La Dulce Princesita. On July 11, 2021 she announced via Facebook that she is 3 months pregnant. On December 10, 2021 she gave birth to her first daughter who she named Micaela Martins Marín to whom she wrote the song "Tu Camino". She has over 3 million followers on social media and over 100 million views on her YouTube channel.

Discography

Studio albums 
Solo
 Me Enamoré De Ti, ¡Y Qué! (2006)
 ¡Cumbia Poder! (2008) 
 ¡Con Estilo! (2011)
 Navidad Maricarmen (2015)
 Navidad Maricarmen 2 (2016)
 Navidad Maricarmen 3 (2017)

Singles 
 Me Enamoré De Ti, ¡Y Qué!
 Sarita Colonia
 Vete Nomás ( From "Al Fondo Hay Sitio")
 Yo No Me Llamo Natacha (From "Yo No Me Llamo Natacha")
 Amor De Novela (From "La Peor De Mis Bodas")
 Obsesión
 Por Fin Soy Libre 
 ¿Por Qué Te Fuiste?
 Mi Suegra (featuring Patrick Romantik)(From "La Peor De Mis Bodas 2")
 Mix Bella (Tribute to Agua Bella)
 Anótalo (with Américo) 
 La Copita
 Que no quede huella
 Color Esperanza (with various artist)
 Tu Camino
 Dejar De Amarte

Collaborations 
 Hasta El Fin Del Mundo (with Diego Dibós)
 Conquístame (with Los Pikadientes de Caborca)
 Mis Sentimientos (with Los Barraza and Daniela Darcourt)

Soundtracks  
 Al Fondo Hay Sitio (2008)
 Yo No me Llamo Natacha (2011)
 La Peor De Mis Bodas (2016)
 Una Navidad En Verano (2018)
 La Peor De Mis Bodas 2 (2019)

Filmography

Television 
 2005: "Teatro Desde El Teatro" (Karla)
 2006: "Vírgenes de la Cumbia" (Fátima)
 2006: "Vírgenes de la Cumbia 2" (Fátima)
 2007: "El Profe"
 2008: "Chapulin el dulce"
 2008: "El Gran reto"
 2008: "La Pre" (Karina)
 2008: "Habacilar" - Amigos y Rivales de la Cumbia (first place)
 2008: "Habacilar" - Los Mejores Amigos y Rivales (fourth place)
 2009: "Habacilar" - Amigos y Rivales Habacilar vs. Reyes de la Cumbia (first place)
 2010: "El Gran Show: First Season (Heroína, third place)
 2010: "Puro corazón"
 2011: "Yo no me llamo Natacha" (Natasha)

Movies 
 2006: "Peloteros"
 2016: "La Peor De Mis Bodas" (Won a Premios Luces award for Best Actress)
 2019: "La Peor De Mis Bodas 2"(Nominated for Premios Luces award for Best Actress)

References

21st-century Peruvian women singers
21st-century Peruvian singers
Living people
1982 births
Peruvian female dancers
Peruvian musicians
Spanish-language singers
Singers from Lima
Rockass Online https://rockassonlinemusic.com/maricarmen-marin-y-los-pikadientes-de-caborca-unidos-con-la-cumbia-romantica-de-conquistame/